Heléne Yorke is a Canadian-American actress, writer, singer, and dancer.

Yorke is known for her work on television. She currently plays Brooke Dubek on the HBO Max series The Other Two. She has also played the roles of Jane Martin on the Showtime American period drama television series Masters of Sex, Olivia Graves on Graves and Amy Breslin on The Good Fight.

Additionally, she is known for her work on Broadway, in particular for originating the roles of Olive Neal in Bullets Over Broadway and Evelyn Williams in American Psycho, as well as for originating G(a)linda in the Munchkinland Tour of Wicked.

Early life
Yorke was born in Vancouver, British Columbia, Canada, and moved to the United States at the age of one. Yorke grew up in Pacific Palisades, California. She started dancing ballet when she was three years old and took her first acting class in middle school. Yorke graduated with a Bachelor of Fine Arts from the University of Michigan.

Career
Yorke has worked on various Broadway productions, including Bullets Over Broadway, American Psycho, and Grease. She also played Glinda in Wicked on tour.

In 2013, Yorke was cast in a recurring role as Jane Martin on Masters of Sex.

In 2016-17, she played a major role in the 2 Seasons of Graves (EPIX), playing Nick Nolte’s daughter.

She currently stars as Brooke Dubek on HBO Max’s The Other Two, which was renewed for a third season in September 2021.

Personal life
Yorke dated chef Bobby Flay from 2016-2019. Throughout their relationship she ran a food-based Instagram account chronicling her cooking adventures with Flay, but the account was deleted following their breakup.

Yorke married Bary Dunn in a Jewish ceremony on September 3, 2021, in Brooklyn, New York. On January 22, 2022, Yorke announced her pregnancy on Instagram. On June 12, 2022 the couple welcomed a son.

Credits

Theatre

Sources:

Film

Television

References

External links
 
 
 

21st-century American actresses
Actresses from Vancouver
American film actresses
American television actresses
Living people
American musical theatre actresses
American voice actresses
University of Michigan alumni
Year of birth missing (living people)